José Ricardo Araújo Fernandes (born 3 February 1999), commonly known as Zé Ricardo, is a Brazilian footballer who plays as a midfielder for Goiás.

Career statistics

References

1999 births
Living people
Footballers from Rio de Janeiro (city)
Brazilian footballers
Association football midfielders
Campeonato Brasileiro Série B players
Campeonato Brasileiro Série D players
Fluminense FC players
Boavista Sport Club players
Londrina Esporte Clube players
Tombense Futebol Clube players
Goiás Esporte Clube players